Davison Lishebo (born 2 January 1955) is a Zambian sprinter. He competed in the men's 400 metres at the 1984 Summer Olympics.

References

1955 births
Living people
Athletes (track and field) at the 1980 Summer Olympics
Athletes (track and field) at the 1984 Summer Olympics
Zambian male sprinters
Olympic athletes of Zambia
Athletes (track and field) at the 1982 Commonwealth Games
Commonwealth Games competitors for Zambia
Place of birth missing (living people)